William Poole (July 24, 1821 – March 8, 1855), also known as Bill the Butcher, was the leader of the Washington Street Gang, which later became known as the Bowery Boys gang. He was a local leader of the Know Nothing political movement in mid-19th-century New York City.

Early life
Poole was born in Sussex County, New Jersey, to parents of English descent. In 1832, his family moved to New York City to open a butcher shop in Washington Market, Manhattan. Poole trained in his father's trade and eventually took over the family store. In the 1840s, he worked with the Howard (Red Rover) Volunteer Fire Engine Company #34, on Hudson and Christopher Streets, and started the Washington Street Gang which later became the Bowery Boys. During this period in New York fires were a huge problem for the city. Volunteer fire groups, such as the one Poole was in, were important for keeping fires under control. These firefighting groups were closely tied with street gangs and were seen as a public service provided by those groups. There were rivalries between the fire companies to put fires down in the neighborhood. One of the strategies that Bowery Boys used to ensure that other fire engine companies could not put out the fires was once hearing the alarm sound, a Bowery Boy would find the nearest fire hydrant to the fire and flip over an empty barrel over the fire hydrant and sit on the barrel, so it could not be seen or used. The Bowery Boy would sit on the barrel until his own fire engine arrived; however, fights over the fire hydrant would break out, and sometimes the Bowery Boys had no time to actually extinguish the fire.

Personality 
William Poole was a large man for the time. He weighed over two hundred pounds and was about six feet tall. He was known for his brutal boxing style: "He was well known as being a notoriously dirty fighter, not averse to biting off noses, gouging out eyeballs, or beating a man to jelly." He fought in many fights that were considered illegal due to the brutality of bare-knuckle boxing. He was also a known skilled knife fighter, as a result of his profession as a butcher. Poole was a known gambler and a heavy drinker. He closed his family's butchery business in the 1850s and opened a drinking saloon, known as the "Bank Exchange".

Street gangs 
Street gangs in New York were fluid in their membership and name as they merged and found new leaders. The most well-known of these was the Bowery Boys, which Poole formed from his own Washington Street gang and a collection of many other street gangs. Other key gangs incorporated into the Bowery Boys were the American Guards, Atlantic Guards, True Blue Americans, and the Order of the Star-Spangled Guard. These gangs were composed of Nativist White Anglo-Saxon Protestants who were opposed to enfranchisement of the growing number of Irish Catholic refugees from the Great Famine. Street gangs, like the Bowery Boys, "were bound by ethnic ties or nativist belief; the members tended to be deeply patriotic, and a common thread was the belief that the country was pretty well full, so that newcomers were not welcomed." Poole's gang was located near to the Five Points neighborhood, where many recent Irish Catholic immigrants settled. Five Points was located in what is now Chinatown in Lower Manhattan. Waves of Irish- and German-Americans moved into the Five Points as their first stop on the way to the American dream. In response to attacks by Poole and his followers, the Irish created their own street gangs. The Dead Rabbits were an Irish-membership gang and the biggest rival of Poole's Bowery Boys. Much of the hatred between the two gangs was based on racial and religious differences. "For years the Bowery Boys and the Dead Rabbits waged a bitter feud, and a week seldom passed in which they did not come to blows, either along the Bowery, in the Five Points section." Both gangs were primarily brawlers and street fighters, another reason why William Poole was a well-known fighter, and most of their battling was done in open spaces. Poole made many alliances with other street gangs that supported his ideology.

Political views
William Poole detested the Democratic Party's local political machine, Tammany Hall, because they accepted and included immigrants as members. Tammany Hall-affiliated street gangs also protected Irish Catholics from Poole's Bowery Boys, whom he sent to terrorize immigrants and keep them from registering to vote. Poole and the Bowery Boys were a de facto extension of the Know Nothings, a nativist and militantly anti-Catholic political party. According to the New Orleans True Delta, the purpose of the Know Nothings was "twofold – part religious, part political; and the ends aimed at the disenfranchisement of adopted citizens, and their exclusion from office, and perpetual war upon the Catholic religion." Originally, the Know Nothings were known as the Native American Party, but changed their name in 1855. Members of the Know Nothing Party had to "be a native-born citizen, of native-born parents, and not of the Catholic religion". The goal was to organize native-born White Anglo-Saxon Protestants to defend and preserve their religion and control of American politics from enfranchised Catholics, Jews, immigrants, and their descendants.

Poole was nominated by the Whig party in April 1848 as a candidate for alderman, representing the Sixth Ward. Poole fared poorly in the general election, receiving only 199 votes and tying for last place with his ticket-mate against four other candidates. 

In February of 1853, Poole was appointed to represent the Sixth Ward on the New York City Board of Education.

Attack at Florence's Hotel
As a well-known gang leader and pugilist, Poole was frequently involved in fights, brawls, and other confrontations. The New York Daily Times reported the following on October 23, 1851:

Dispute with John Morrissey

Poole's arch rival, John Morrissey, was an Irish immigrant and worked for the political machine at Tammany Hall. Morrissey was also a popular bare-knuckle boxer and challenged Poole to a match. Though the two men were of differing ethnic backgrounds and political parties, the initial grounds for their dispute may have arisen from an earlier bet by Poole on a boxing match at Boston Corners on October 12, 1853, in which Poole had placed his bet on Morrissey's opponent, "Yankee Sullivan". The results of the boxing match were disputed—Sullivan beat Morrisey but was then distracted into leaving the ring by Morrisey's friends and the referee announced Morrisey winner for being in the ring—and Poole was against Morrissey being paid. In 1854 a fight was arranged between Morrissey and Poole, which Poole won.

Shooting and death
Morrissey plotted revenge and on February 25, 1855, recently fired NYPD patrolman Lewis Baker and Jim Turner, who were allegedly acting as enforcers for Morrissey, shot Poole in the leg and chest at Stanwix Hall, a bar on Broadway near Prince, at that time a center of the city's nightlife. The New York Daily Times reported on February 26, 1855, the following:

Several days after the shooting, on March 8, 1855, Poole died in his home on Christopher Street at the age of 33.  Poole was survived by his wife and son, Charles Poole. The war between Poole and Morrissey had been very public and The New York Times covered the events of Stanwix Hall almost every day for a month. A local newsman reported Poole's last words were, "Good-bye, boys; I die a true American." He was buried on March 11, 1855, in Brooklyn's Green-Wood Cemetery with thousands of spectators.

Lewis Baker fled New York City, with the help of Daniel Kerrigan, a twenty-four year old 1853 Democratic nominee for councilman. Kerrigan was an Irish-American and expressed sympathy for Baker. The Times called Kerrigan "one 'of the principle accessories to the murder of Poole and the flight of Baker." Facing an international manhunt organized by Poole's patrons in the Know Nothing Party, Baker boarded the Jewett and sailed for the Canary Islands. He was intercepted, however, on the high seas on April 17, 1855. Baker was arrested and returned to New York City to be tried for the murder of William Poole. All three trials, however, ended with a hung jury and Baker ultimately walked away a free man. Morrissey went on to open up several Irish pubs and accumulated a fortune of $1.5 million. He later served two terms as a New York state senator and two more terms in the U.S. House of Representatives. Morrissey died in 1878 and lies buried in a Roman Catholic cemetery in his childhood hometown of Troy, New York.

Film
Daniel Day-Lewis played a heavily fictionalized version of Bill the Butcher, renamed William Cutting, in the 2002 Martin Scorsese film Gangs of New York. The chief differences between the historical Poole and the cinematic "Butcher": while Poole died before the Civil War, the fictional character is still alive and leading his street gang in 1862, and he claims his father was killed by the British at the Battle of Lundy's Lane which took place seven years before he was born. The character is slain in an epic street battle at the end of the film.

See also
 Dead Rabbits riot

References

 Charlton T. Lewis, Harper's Book of Facts, New York, 1906
 Herbert Asbury, The Gangs of New York, New York, 1928
 Mark Caldwell, New York Night: The Mystique and Its History, New York, 2005
 Seth F. Abrams and Rose Keefe, The Killing of Bill the Butcher: William Poole and the Battle for Old New York, New York, 2010

Selected coverage in the New York Daily Times

 New York Daily Times, Volume 1, Number 0031, Thursday, October 23, 1851, page 1 "Boxing"
 New York Daily Times, Volume 3, Number 0646, Thursday, October 13, 1853, page 1 "hotel"
 New York Daily Times, Volume 3, Number 0892, July 28, 1854, page 4 "Boxing teaser"
 New York Daily Times, Volume 3, Number 0892, July 28, 1854, page 8 "Boxing"
 New York Daily Times, Volume 4, Number 1074, Monday, February 26, 1855, page 1, "Shooting"
 New York Daily Times, Volume 4, Number 1084, Friday, March 9, 1855, page 1, "Coroner's Inquest"

Selected coverage in the Brooklyn Eagle
 

 Brooklyn Eagle, March 20, 1855, page 2, "The Poole murder"
 Brooklyn Eagle, March 20, 1855, page 3, "The death of bully Poole"
 Brooklyn Eagle, March 24, 1855, page 3, "Grand jury"

Selected coverage in the New York Times

 New York Times, March 9, 1855, page 1, "The Pugilist's Encounter"
 New York Times, March 10, 1855, page 1, "The Death of William Poole"
 New York Times, March 12, 1855, page 1, "The Stanwix Hall Tragedy"
 New York Times, March 12, 1855, page 4, "The Funeral of Poole"
 New York Times, March 13, 1855, page 1, "The Poole Murder"
 New York Times, March 17, 1855, page 1, "The Poole Murder"
 New York Times, March 19, 1855, page 1, "The Poole Murder"
 New York Times, March 24, 1855, page 3, "The Kissane Trial"
 New York Times, April 16, 1855, page 3, "The Stanwix Hall Tragedy"
 New York Times, May 16, 1855; page 1, "Baker Arrested!"
 New York Times, May 17, 1855; page 4, "The Poole Murder—What is to come of it?"
 New York Times, November 28, 1855, page 7, "The Stanwix Hall Tragedy"
 New York Times, November 29, 1855, page 3, "The Stanwix Hall Tragedy"
 New York Times, December 1, 1855, page 2, "The Stanwix Hall Tragedy"
 New York Times, December 3, 1855, page 2, "The Stanwix Hall Tragedy"
 New York Times, December 4, 1855, page 7, "The Stanwix Hall Tragedy"
 New York Times, December 5, 1855, page 3, "The Stanwix Hall Tragedy"
 New York Times, December 6, 1855, page 2, "The Stanwix Hall Tragedy"
 New York Times, December 7, 1855, page 3, "The Stanwix Hall Tragedy"
 New York Times, December 8, 1855, page 3, "The Stanwix Hall Tragedy"
 New York Times, December 10, 1855, page 2, "The Stanwix Hall Tragedy"
 New York Times, December 11, 1855, page 2, "The Stanwix Hall Tragedy"
 New York Times, December 12, 1855, page 3, "The Stanwix Hall Tragedy"
 New York Times, December 13, 1855, page 7, "The Stanwix Hall Tragedy"
 New York Times, December 14, 1855, page 1, "The Stanwix Hall Tragedy"

External links

Bill Poole - American National Biography
William Poole bibliography
NY Press: William Poole

Article From New York Times reporting February 26, 1855, on the shooting of Bill Poole at Stanwix Hall on Broadway in NYC (requires user account)

People from Sussex County, New Jersey
Burials at Green-Wood Cemetery
Deaths by firearm in Manhattan
American people of English descent
1821 births
1855 deaths
American political bosses from New York (state)
New York (state) Know Nothings
19th-century American politicians
Murdered American gangsters
People murdered in New York City
Male murder victims
Deaths from pneumonia in New York City